Kristján Örn Kristjánsson (born 25 December 1997) is an Icelandic handball player for Pays d'Aix UC and the Icelandic national team.
He represented Iceland at the 2021 World Men's Handball Championship.

References

External links 
 Pays d'Aix UC profile
 EHF profile

1997 births
Living people
Kristjan Orn Kristjansson
Expatriate handball players
Kristjan Orn Kristjansson